Khatamabad (also Romanized as Khātamābād) is a village in Bavaleh Rural District, in the Central District of Sonqor County, Kermanshah Province, Iran. According to the 2006 census, its population was 214, in 47 families.

References 

Populated places in Sonqor County